General elections were held in Liberia in May 1959. In the presidential election, William Tubman of the True Whig Party was re-elected for a fourth term, defeating independent candidate William O. Davies Bright, who received just 55 votes. For the first time, a woman was elected to the Legislature, with Ellen Mills Scarbrough winning a seat in the House of Representatives.

Results

President

References

Liberia
General
Elections in Liberia
Liberia
Election and referendum articles with incomplete results